Don Porcella is contemporary American multimedia artist, most known for his pipe cleaner sculptures and encaustic paintings. Don Porcella is best known elevating mess-market craft materials into high art. Porcella's subjects are usually inspired by consumerism and folk art with humor.

Life and work
Don Porcella was born 1963 in California, the United States of America, youngest son of Robert.S.Porcella, doctor and farmer, and  Yvonne Porcella, a celebrated folk artist. He studied Psychology in the University of California, San Diego, Porcella got bachelor's degree in art from California College of Arts and Crafts, and earned Master of Fine Arts degree from Hunter College in New York.

Don Porcella is best known for pipe cleaner sculptures and installations using popular craft materials. Porcella's works are often making fun of the absurd consumerism and the human conditions.

Collections
Canadian musician Kevin Hearn's album Cloud Maintenance is named after one of Porcella's painting and also used the image as the cover art. Porcella's work is part of various private and public collections such as, Swatch Art Collection, The West Collection, Jean Pigozzi, Beth Rudin DeWoody, Eli Broad, Mary Boone, Jeffrey Deitch, and Morgan Spurlock.

Music
Don Porcella wrote the song "Vacuum", a collaboration with Iranian artist Salome MC during Swatch, Art Peace Residency in Shanghai. The music video was later featured in 2015 Venice Biennale.

Exhibitions
In 2007, Porcella participated in the exhibition at the London Art Fair. He has participated in numerous group exhibitions, including one at the Art Miami at Art Basel Fair, Robert Miller Gallery, Museum of Art and Design. His work has appeared in Brooklyn Museum (2012); Hudson Valley Center for Contemporary Art (2012); Torrance Art Museum in California (2014), Rockbund Art Museum in China (2014).

References

External links
   Official website including CV and works

1963 births
Living people
Artists from California
California College of the Arts alumni